The 2020–21 United States Senate election in Georgia was held on November 3, 2020, and on January 5, 2021 (as a runoff), to elect the Class II member of the United States Senate to represent the State of Georgia. Democrat Jon Ossoff defeated incumbent Republican Senator David Perdue in the runoff election. The general election was held concurrently with the 2020 presidential election, as well as with other elections to the Senate, elections to the U.S. House of Representatives and various state and local elections.

No candidate received a majority of the vote during the general election on November 3, so the top two finishers—Perdue (49.7%) and Ossoff (47.9%)—advanced to a runoff election, held on January 5, 2021. The runoff was held concurrently with the special election for Georgia's other U.S. Senate seat (which had also advanced to a runoff), in which Republican incumbent Kelly Loeffler lost to Democratic nominee Raphael Warnock. After the general round of elections, Republicans held 50 Senate seats and the Democratic caucus 48 (including two independents who caucus with them). As a result, the two runoffs decided control of the Senate under the incoming Biden administration. By winning both seats, Democrats took control of the chamber, with Vice President Kamala Harris's tie-breaking vote giving them an effective majority. The extraordinarily high political stakes caused the races to attract significant attention nationwide and globally. On January 6, 2021, most major news outlets projected Ossoff the winner, in the midst of the US Capitol riot. Perdue conceded the race on January 8. According to OpenSecrets, this campaign was the most expensive in U.S. Senate history, with over $468 million spent. Ossoff's victory, along with Warnock's, gave the Democrats control of the Senate for the first time since 2015. Ossoff and Warnock became the first Democrats to be elected to the U.S. Senate from Georgia since Zell Miller in the 2000 special election.

Ossoff became the first Democrat elected to a full term in the Senate from Georgia since Max Cleland, who held this seat from 1997 to 2003, and the first Jewish member of the Senate from the state. Ossoff became the youngest senator since Don Nickles won in 1980, and the youngest Democrat since Joe Biden won in 1972. Georgia election officials certified Ossoff's victory on January 19, 2021; he was sworn in on January 20. Ossoff is the first Jewish senator from the Deep South since Benjamin F. Jonas of Louisiana, who was elected in 1878, and the first millennial United States senator. This election and the special election both mark the first time since 1994 that both Senate seats in a state have flipped from one party to the other in a single election cycle. This was the first time the Democrats achieved this since West Virginia's 1958 Senate elections. With a margin of 1.2%, this election was also the closest race of the 2020 Senate election cycle.

Republican primary

Candidates

Nominee
David Perdue, incumbent U.S. Senator

Withdrawn
James Jackson
Michael Jowers, veteran
Ervan Katari Miller, perennial candidate

Declined
Derrick Grayson, activist and U.S. Senate candidate in 2014 and 2016. (ran in the special election).

Results

Democratic primary

Candidates

Nominee
Jon Ossoff, investigative journalist, media executive, nominee for Georgia's 6th congressional district in 2017

Eliminated in primary
Teresa Tomlinson, former mayor of Columbus
Sarah Riggs Amico, nominee for Lieutenant Governor of Georgia in 2018
Marckeith DeJesus, candidate for Georgia State Senate in 2017 and candidate for Georgia House of Representatives in 2016
Maya Dillard-Smith, former two-term Senate Appointee Judge over judicial performance and Rules Committee Chair
James Knox, retired U.S. Air Force officer
Tricia Carpenter McCracken, journalist and nominee for Georgia's 12th congressional district in 2016

Withdrew
Akhenaten Amun, high school teacher
Harold Shouse
Ted Terry, mayor of Clarkston (endorsed Ossoff)
Elaine Whigham Williams, pastor and candidate for president in 2016

Declined
Stacey Abrams, nominee for governor of Georgia in 2018 and former minority leader of the Georgia House of Representatives (endorsed Ossoff)
Jason Carter, grandson of former Georgia Governor and President Jimmy Carter, former state senator, and nominee for governor of Georgia in 2014 (endorsed Tomlinson)
Stacey Evans, former state representative and candidate for governor of Georgia in 2018 (running for state house)
Scott Holcomb, state representative
Jen Jordan, state senator
Michelle Nunn, nominee for U.S. Senate in 2014
Kasim Reed, former mayor of Atlanta
Doug Teper, former state representative
Sally Yates, former United States Deputy Attorney General

Polling

Head-to-head polling

Endorsements

Results

Almost four times as many Georgia voters participated in the 2020 Democratic Senate primary as in the 2016 primary, when only 310,053 votes were cast.

Other candidates

Libertarian Party

Nominee
Shane Hazel, former U.S. Marine, podcaster, and Republican candidate for Georgia's 7th congressional district in 2018

Independents

Withdrawn
 Elbert "Al" Bartell, perennial candidate (running as an independent candidate in the 2020–21 United States Senate special election in Georgia)
 Allen Buckley, Libertarian candidate for the 2016 United States Senate election in Georgia (running as an independent candidate in the 2020–21 United States Senate special election in Georgia)
 Tom Jones
 Clifton Kilby
 Darrell McGuire (as a write-in candidate), retired Georgia State Trooper
 Valencia Stovall, Georgian Democratic state representative from District 74 since 2013 (running as an independent candidate in the 2020–21 United States Senate special election in Georgia)

Debates
The first debate between Hazel, Ossoff, and Perdue occurred virtually on October 12.

A second debate between Ossoff and Perdue, held on October 28 in Savannah and aired on television station WTOC-TV, was more heated and made national headlines, with Ossoff saying that Perdue had claimed "COVID-19 was no deadlier than the flu", was "looking after [his] own assets, and... portfolio", and that Perdue voted "four times to end protections for preexisting conditions". Ossoff also called Perdue a "crook" and criticized him for "attacking the health of the people that [he] represent[s]". Perdue said Ossoff will "say and do anything to my friends in Georgia to mislead them about how radical and socialist" his agenda is. Video of the exchange went viral.

The next day, October 29, Perdue said he would not attend the third and final debate, previously scheduled to be broadcast on WSB-TV on November 1; instead Perdue decided to attend a rally with President Trump in Rome on the same day—"as lovely as another debate listening to Jon Ossoff lie to the people of Georgia sounds", according to a Perdue spokesman.

On December 6, Ossoff debated an empty podium as Perdue declined to participate in a Georgia Public Broadcasting-held debate. Ossoff criticized Perdue's absence, accusing him of skipping the event because of the negative response to his performance in the October debates.

General election

Predictions

Endorsements

Polling

Graphical summary

Aggregate polls

with Teresa Tomlinson

with Sarah Riggs Amico

with Stacey Abrams

with Generic Democrat

with Generic Republican and Generic Democrat

Results 
No candidate received a majority of the vote on November 3, so the top two finishers—incumbent Republican senator David Perdue (49.7%) and Democratic challenger Jon Ossoff (47.9%)—advanced to a runoff election held on January 5, 2021.

Voters whose mail-in ballots were rejected were allowed to submit corrections until 5pm on November 6.

Runoff
The runoff election between Perdue and Ossoff was on January 5, 2021, alongside the special election for the Georgia U.S. Senate seat held by Republican Kelly Loeffler.

Following the 2020 Senate elections, Republicans held 50 Senate seats and the Democratic caucus 48. Since Democrats won both Georgia runoffs, their caucus gained control of the Senate, as the resultant 50–50 tie is broken by Democratic vice president Kamala Harris. If the Democrats had lost either race, Republicans would have retained control of the Senate. The high political stakes caused the races to attract significant nationwide attention. These elections are the third and fourth Senate runoff elections to be held in Georgia since runoffs were first mandated in 1964, following runoffs in 1992 and 2008. It is also the third time that both of Georgia's Senate seats have been up for election at the same time, following double-barrel elections in 1914 and 1932.

The deadline for registration for the runoff election was December 7, 2020. Absentee ballots for the runoff election were sent out beginning on November 18, and in-person voting began on December 14. Ossoff's runoff campaign largely focused around accusing Perdue of corruption as well as aggressively courting Black voters in an attempt to drive up turnout, while Perdue characterised Ossoff as a socialist and accused him of having ties to the People's Republic of China. Perdue's campaign was hampered by his refusal to state that Joe Biden had won that year's presidential election, which made it exceedingly difficult for him to argue that an Ossoff victory would create a Democratic trifecta.

Predictions

Polling

Aggregate polls

This section also contains pre-runoff polls excluding all candidates except head-to-head matchups.

with Generic Republican and Generic Democrat

Results

Counties that flipped from Republican to Democratic
 Cobb (largest municipality: Marietta)
 Gwinnett (largest municipality: Peachtree Corners)

Counties that flipped from Democratic to Republican
 Baker (largest municipality: Newton)
 Burke (largest municipality: Waynesboro)
 Chattahoochee (largest municipality: Cusseta)
 Dooly (largest municipality: Vienna)
 Twiggs (largest municipality: Jeffersonville)

See also
 Fair Fight Action
Voter suppression in the United States 2019–2020: Georgia
 2020 Georgia (U.S. state) elections

Notes
Partisan clients

Voter samples and additional candidates

References

Further reading

External links
 
  (State affiliate of the U.S. League of Women Voters)
Elections  at the Georgia Secretary of State official website

 
 
Request a mail-in ballot at the Georgia Secretary of State website
Check to see if you are registered to vote  at the Georgia Secretary of State website
Register to vote at Vote.org

Official campaign websites
 Shane T. Hazel (L) for Senate
 Jon Ossoff (D) for Senate
 David Perdue (R) for Senate

United States Senate elections in Georgia (U.S. state)
Georgia
Georgia
United States Senate
United States Senate